Tha Myat (29 April 1899 – 24 November 1977) was a linguist, known for his works on writing systems of Burma (Myanmar), notably on the Pyu language.

Early life
Tha Myat was born on 29 April 1899 to a merchant family of Ngwe Thin and Po Mya in Padigon. He studied at his local monastery until 12 before leaving for Gyobingauk to continue schooling at R.C.M. St. Michael's School. There, during summer holidays, he studied Hindi reading and writing from an Indian man.

After completing 7th Standard, he then went on to study at Prome High School in Pyay. He passed the university matriculation examination with honors in English, Burmese and Pali. Then, he studied at Government College. In 1921, he finished intermediate college with honors, and received a scholarship to further study at Pune Agricultural College, then an affiliate college of the University of Bombay. He married Me Yee, daughter of Lu and Se, before leaving for India. He read agricultural economics and intensive farming, graduating with a bachelor's degree in agriculture in 1924. He received F.R.H.S. and M.R.Ag.S. degrees from the Royal Horticultural Society, London.

Career
Upon his return from India in 1924, he joined the Department of Agriculture. He served as Agricultural Deputy Commissioner of Magway Division for 14 years. It was there that he began to take interest in the Burmese language, and began researching on the language. In 1954, he retired as Director of Dekkhina Circle, and became the Director of Cultural Institute, Rangoon. In that same year, he was awarded the Thiri Pyanchi Gold Medal by the government.

On 23 December 1957, he received an honorary degree from Rangoon University. Throughout the 1950s, Tha Myat represented the country at a number of state missions to several countries, including India, Pakistan, the Soviet Union, Poland, Czechoslovakia, Romania, East Germany, West Germany, Britain, France, Yugoslavia, Italy and Egypt.

Associations
Tha Myat was a member of Thukhamein team of the Burma Translation Society. In 1953, he was vice president of the Burma Science Association. In 1958, he became president of the Burma-India Culture Association and a member of the council of University for Adult Education. He took part in that council for 11 years and served as president from 1961 to 1964. In 1968, he was elected president of the Burma Research Society. He also served as vice president, and later as president of the Tharay Khittaya Association.

Works
In academic records, his name is typically Romanized as  Ūʺ Sā Mrat' (according to the Library of Congress ALA-LC transcription system for Burmese).

Published books

Unpublished works
 Burmese Etymology

Lectures

As coauthor, editor

Death
Tha Myat died on 24 November 1977 in Yangon.

See also

 List of Burmese writers
 List of linguists

Further reading
 , Burma's Cultural Relations with Foreign Countries—Past and Present by U Tha Myat, Director of Culture, Burma (Broadcast talk in Czechoslovakia and Romania)
 , The Light of Buddha Vol III No 1, January, 1958 PDF- Pariyatti-Buddhism in South-East Asia By U Tha Myat, pages 22–28

References

1899 births
1977 deaths
20th-century Buddhists
20th-century linguists
20th-century male writers
20th-century Burmese people
Burmese agriculturalists
Burmese Buddhists
Burmese Theravada Buddhists
Burmese people of World War II
Fellows of the Royal Horticultural Society
Linguists from Myanmar
Members of Royal Agricultural Society
People from Bago Region
People from Magway Division
Presidents of the Burma Research Society
University of Mumbai alumni
University of Yangon alumni
Recipients of the Thiri Pyanchi
Linguists of Pyu (Sino-Tibetan)